Dr. Rajiv Saizal (born 11 July 1971) is an Indian politician and current Health & Family Welfare and Ayurveda Minister of Government of Himachal Pradesh. Saizal is a member of the Himachal Pradesh Legislative Assembly from the Kasauli constituency in Solan district. He is a member of the Bharatiya Janata Party.

References 

People from Solan district
Bharatiya Janata Party politicians from Himachal Pradesh
Living people
1971 births
Himachal Pradesh MLAs 2017–2022
Himachal Pradesh MLAs 2007–2012
Himachal Pradesh MLAs 2012–2017